Gymnothorax prolatus is a moray eel found in the northwest Pacific Ocean, around Taiwan. It was first named by Sasaki and Amaoka in 1991, and can measure up to approximately 40 centimetres.

References

prolatus
Fish described in 1991